Theophilus Danzy (May 20, 1930 – November 27, 2012) was an American football coach.  He served as the head football coach at Prairie View A&M University (1972), Alabama Agricultural and Mechanical University (1977–1978), Miles College (1980–1982), Alcorn State University (1986–1990), and Stillman College (1999–2005), compiling a career college football record of 84–88–3. He was an alumnus of Tennessee State University.  Danzy died on November 27, 2012.

Head coaching record

References

1930 births
2012 deaths
Alabama A&M Bulldogs football coaches
Alcorn State Braves football coaches
Arkansas–Pine Bluff Golden Lions football coaches
Miles Golden Bears football coaches
Prairie View A&M Panthers football coaches
Stillman Tigers football coaches
Tennessee State University alumni
Sportspeople from Tuscaloosa, Alabama
African-American coaches of American football
20th-century African-American sportspeople
21st-century African-American sportspeople